Small Things Like These is a historical fiction novel by Claire Keegan, published on November 30, 2021, by Grove Press. In 2022, the book won the Orwell Prize for Political Fiction, and was shortlisted for the Rathbones Folio Prize and the Booker Prize.

Premise 
"It is 1985 in a small Irish town. During the weeks leading up to Christmas, Bill Furlong, a coal merchant and family man faces into his busiest season. Early one morning, while delivering an order to the local convent, Bill makes a discovery which forces him to confront both his past and the complicit silences of a town controlled by the church."

Reception 
Small Things Like These was generally well-received by critics and received starred reviews from Kirkus Reviews and Library Journal.

Multiple reviewers commented on the moral storytelling, which comes across as "a sort of anti-Christmas Carol." Kirkus called the book "[a] stunning feat of storytelling and moral clarity." The Herald said the book "assures us we are all capable of doing the right thing, and that goodness, like misery, can be handed on from man to man."

This depth of the book surprised some reviewers, given that Small Things Like These is a quick read that could be considered a novella given its length. Associated Press noted, "Keegan's economy of prose is a marvel ... The book takes just an hour or so to read, but you still feel like you know Bill Furlong by the end and understand why he does what he does. His tale of quiet heroism doesn't require any more words." A similar sentiment was echoed in the Los Angeles Times, who wrote, "Keegan, whose short stories contain unusual depth and grandeur, is the only contemporary writer who could manage the feat of a completely imagined, structured and sustained world with such brevity."

Reviewers also highlighted Keegan's writing style. Keegan's prose was referred to as  "surprisingly powerful," "languid and crystalline" in Booklist, as well as "quiet and precise, jewel-like in its clarity" in Library Journal. Further, the Financial Times noted, "Keegan has a keen ear for dialect without letting it overwhelm conversations," and Damon Galgut wrote in The Times Literary Supplement: "Keegan knows how to weigh and pace her sentences, and her fine judgement delivers many subtle pleasures ... [she] fully exploits the power of understatement."

Lamorna Ash writing in The Guardian noted that "Small Things Like These [does] not feel quite as devastating, as lasting, as Keegan’s previous work[.] Perhaps, for the first time in her writing, the lightness here has become too light – is kept too far away from the darkness that lurks at the other side of the town."

Adaptation 
The Irish Independent reported in February 2023 that shooting locations for the film adaptation of the book were being sought with Cillian Murphy on-board the project.

References 

2021 Irish novels
Historical fiction
Novels set in the 1980s
Novels set in Ireland
Grove Press books